Nathalia Fernandez (born May 6, 1988) is an American politician serving as a Democratic member of the New York State Senate representing the 34th Senate District.

Early life
Fernandez was born to parents William and Sonia. Her father immigrated to the United States from Cuba and her mother immigrated from Colombia. She grew up in Rockland County and later Westchester County, where she graduated from high school. She graduated from North Salem High School.  Fernandez attended Hofstra University.

Political career

In 2012, Fernandez volunteered for Mark Gjonaj's campaign for New York State Assembly. After Gjonaj won, Fernandez joined his staff as executive coordinator. She later rose to be Gjonaj's Chief of Staff.

In 2017, Fernandez joined the staff of New York Governor Andrew Cuomo as the representative of his office to the Bronx.

Following the election of Mark Gjonaj to the New York City Council, the 80th New York State Assembly district was left vacant and a special election was held on April 24, 2018. Fernandez ran on the Democratic and Independence party lines against Gene DeFrancis, who ran on the Republican, Conservative, and Reform party lines.

In late 2018, Fernandez ran for a full term in the Assembly. She was unopposed for the democratic nomination. Fernandez ran on the Democratic party line against Louis Perri, who ran on the Republican and Conservative lines. Fernandez won over 81% of the vote.

References

American politicians of Colombian descent
Hispanic and Latino American women in politics
American politicians of Cuban descent
Living people
Women state legislators in New York (state)
Democratic Party members of the New York State Assembly
Candidates in the 2021 United States elections
21st-century American politicians
21st-century American women politicians
Year of birth missing (living people)
People from Rockland County, New York
People from Westchester County, New York
Hofstra University alumni
Politicians from the Bronx
Hispanic and Latino American state legislators in New York (state)